Nge Nge Htwe (born 9 March 1998) is a Burmese footballer who plays as a midfielder for the Myanmar women's national team.

International goals

References

1998 births
Living people
Women's association football midfielders
Burmese women's footballers
Sportspeople from Yangon
Myanmar women's international footballers